Fluff may  refer to:

Fictional characters
 Princess Fluff, in L. Frank Baum's Oz books Queen Zixi of Ix and The Road to Oz
 Doc and Fluff: The Dystopian Tale of a Girl and Her Biker by Patrick Califia
 Fluff, in the radio and internet series The Space Gypsy Adventures
 Louise "Fluff" Phillips, in the 1937 film Kid Galahad, played by Bette Davis

Music
 Fluff (band), a Swedish punk rock band
 Fluff, the third album released by the Swedish music group Atomic Swing
 "Fluff", an instrumental song on Black Sabbath's album Sabbath Bloody Sabbath
 Fluff Fest, a vegan hardcore punk festival held annually in Rokycany, Czech Republic

Nickname
 Mike Cowan (born 1948), golf caddy, formerly for Tiger Woods
 Alan Freeman (1927–2006), Australian-born British disc jockey and radio personality
 Jim Weaver (left-handed pitcher) (born 1939), American former Major League Baseball pitcher

Other uses
 Slang for flatulence
 A lightweight file manager using the FLTK user interface library and the default file manager in Tiny Core Linux
 A popular brand of marshmallow creme

See also
 Navel fluff or lint
 Fluf, an American punk rock band
 Fluffing (disambiguation)
 Fluffy (disambiguation)

Lists of people by nickname